The Fredericia–Aarhus Line is a  long standard-gauge double-track railway line in Denmark which runs between the cities of Fredericia and Århus in East Jutland. It constitutes a section of the East Jutland Main Line, the through railway line through the Jutland Peninsula from Padborg to Frederikshavn.

The railway opened in 1868. The line is owned and maintained by Rail Net Denmark and served with passenger trains by the railway companies DSB and Arriva.

Future
As part of plans for high-speed rail in Denmark, a new section of track between Hovedgård and Hasselager, bypassing Skanderborg, is planned.

References

External links 

 Banedanmark – government agency responsible for maintenance and traffic control of most of the Danish railway network
 DSB – largest Danish train operating company
 Arriva – British multinational public transport company operating bus and train services in Denmark
 Danske Jernbaner – website with information on railway history in Denmark
 Line information (TIB) from Banedanmark

Railway lines in Denmark
Rail transport in the Central Denmark Region
Rail transport in the Region of Southern Denmark
Railway lines opened in 1868
1868 establishments in Denmark